Arnas may refer to:
 Arnas, Rhône, a commune in France
 , a civil parish in Sernancelhe, Portugal
 Arnäs (disambiguation), several places in Sweden
 Arnas (given name), a Lithuanian given name (including a list of people with the name)

See also 
 Arna (disambiguation)
 Arnes (disambiguation)
 Arnus (disambiguation)